In magnetostatics, the force of attraction or repulsion between two current-carrying wires (see first figure below) is often called Ampère's force law. The physical origin of this force is that each wire generates a magnetic field, following the Biot–Savart law, and the other wire experiences a magnetic force as a consequence, following the Lorentz force law.

Equation

Special case: Two straight parallel wires

The best-known and simplest example of Ampère's force law, which underlaid (before 20 May 2019) the definition of the ampere, the SI unit of current, states that the magnetic force per unit length between two straight parallel conductors is 

 

This is a good approximation if one wire is sufficiently longer than the other, so that it can be approximated as infinitely long, and if the distance between the wires is small compared to their lengths (so that the one infinite-wire approximation holds), but large compared to their diameters (so that they may also be approximated as infinitely thin lines). The value of  depends upon the system of units chosen, and the value of  decides how large the unit of current will be.

In the SI system,

with  the magnetic constant, in SI units

General case
The general formulation of the magnetic force for arbitrary geometries is based on iterated line integrals and combines the Biot–Savart law and Lorentz force in one equation as shown below.

where
 is the total magnetic force felt by wire 1 due to wire 2 (usually measured in newtons),
The double line integration sums the force upon each element of wire 1 due to the magnetic field of each element of wire 2,
The vector  is the unit vector pointing from the differential element on wire 2 towards the differential element on wire 1, and |r| is the distance separating these elements,
The multiplication × is a vector cross product,

To determine the force between wires in a material medium, the magnetic constant is replaced by the actual permeability of the medium.

For the case of two separate closed wires, the law can be rewritten in the following equivalent way by expanding the vector triple product and applying Stokes' theorem:

In this form, it is immediately obvious that the force on wire 1 due to wire 2 is equal and opposite the force on wire 2 due to wire 1, in accordance with Newton's 3rd law.

Historical background

The form of Ampere's force law commonly given was derived by Maxwell and is one of several expressions consistent with the original experiments of Ampère and Gauss. 
The x-component of the force between two linear currents I and I, as depicted in the adjacent diagram, was given by Ampère in 1825 and Gauss in 1833 as follows:

Following Ampère, a number of scientists, including Wilhelm Weber, Rudolf Clausius, James Clerk Maxwell, Bernhard Riemann, Hermann Grassmann, and Walther Ritz, developed this expression to find a fundamental expression of the force. Through differentiation, it can be shown that:

and also the identity:

With these expressions, Ampère's force law can be expressed as:

Using the identities:

and

Ampère's results can be expressed in the form:

As Maxwell noted, terms can be added to this expression, which are derivatives of a function Q(r) and, when integrated, cancel each other out. Thus, Maxwell gave "the most general form consistent with the experimental facts" for the force on ds arising from the action of ds':

Q is a function of r, according to Maxwell, which "cannot be determined, without assumptions of some kind, from experiments in which the active current forms a closed circuit." Taking the function Q(r) to be of the form:

We obtain the general expression for the force exerted on ds by ds:

Integrating around s' eliminates k and the original expression given by Ampère and Gauss is obtained. Thus, as far as the original Ampère experiments are concerned, the value of k has no significance. Ampère took k=−1; Gauss took k=+1, as did Grassmann and Clausius, although Clausius omitted the S component. In the non-ethereal electron theories, Weber took k=−1 and Riemann took k=+1. Ritz left k undetermined in his theory. If we take k = −1, we obtain the Ampère expression:

If we take k=+1, we obtain

Using the vector identity for the triple cross product, we may express this result as

When integrated around ds' the second term is zero, and thus we find the form of Ampère's force law given by Maxwell:

Derivation of parallel straight wire case from general formula

Start from the general formula:

Assume wire 2 is along the x-axis, and wire 1 is at y=D, z=0, parallel to the x-axis. Let  be the x-coordinate of the differential element of wire 1 and wire 2, respectively. Also,

and 
Therefore, the integral is

Evaluating the cross-product:

If wire 1 is also infinite, the integral diverges, because the total attractive force between two infinite parallel wires is infinity. In fact, what we really want to know is the attractive force per unit length of wire 1. Therefore, assume wire 1 has a large but finite length . Then the force vector felt by wire 1 is:

As expected, the force that the wire feels is proportional to its length. The force per unit length is:

The direction of the force is along the y-axis, representing wire 1 getting pulled towards wire 2 if the currents are parallel, as expected. The magnitude of the force per unit length agrees with the expression for  shown above.

Notable derivations of Ampère's force law
Chronologically ordered:
Ampère's original 1823 derivation:

Maxwell's 1873 derivation:
Treatise on Electricity and Magnetism vol. 2, part 4, ch. 2 (§§502–527)
Pierre Duhem's 1892 derivation:
  (EPUB)
translation of: Leçons sur l'électricité et le magnétisme vol. 3, appendix to book 14, pp. 309-332 
Alfred O'Rahilly's 1938 derivation:
Electromagnetic Theory: A Critical Examination of Fundamentals vol. 1, pp. 102–104 (cf. the following pages, too)

See also
 Ampere
 Magnetic constant
 Lorentz force
 Ampère's circuital law
 Free space

References and notes

External links
Ampère's force law Includes animated graphic of the force vectors.

Ampere's law
Ampere's law